Diarsia gaudens is a moth of the family Noctuidae. It is endemic to Java.

Diarsia
Moths described in 1905